Jamie Burnett (born 16 September 1975) is a Scottish former professional snooker player from Hamilton, South Lanarkshire.

A journeyman, Burnett was ranked within the world's top 64 players for 20 consecutive years between 1996 and 2016, reaching his career best ranking, 27th, in 1999. He appeared in one major final, at the 2010 Shanghai Masters, where he lost 10–7 to Ali Carter, and reached the final of one minor-ranking event, the 2012 Gdynia Open, where Neil Robertson beat him 4–3.

Career
Burnett made his mark in the 1997 German Open by reaching the quarter finals and equalled his best run the following year in the 1998 Grand Prix. In a 1997–98 season dominated by Stephen Hendry, Burnett claimed two victories over the world number one as well as recorded victories over Stephen Lee and Mark Williams. He made his first appearance in the final stages of the World Championship in 1996, when he led Terry Griffiths 5–0 and 9–5 before losing 9–10. His second appearance did not come until 2009, equalling Barry Pinches' record for the longest gap between Crucible appearances.

During the qualifying stages of the 2004 UK Championship, he was the first player to complete a break of over 147 in a professional match, playing against Leo Fernandez. After being awarded a free ball Burnett took the brown as an extra red, then a brown, then added 15 reds and 12 blacks, two pinks and a blue. He then potted the colours to complete a 148 break. He afterwards commented "I didn't really know how to react afterwards. At first I thought it was no big deal, but then I realised I'd made history."

Burnett qualified for the 2008 UK Championship, losing 3–9 to his practice partner Stephen Maguire in the first round. Bookmakers ceased taking bets on the exact scoreline after a surge of bets for that result. In frame 12 Burnett had a chance to make the scoreline 4–8, missing a straightforward final black by so much that BBC analyst John Parrott suggested that an amateur player would be unhappy. The BBC's Clive Everton commented that the circumstances of the final two frames merited investigation. Everton said in commentary "An independent inquiry should be conducted by snooker people with knowledge to appreciate the relative difficulty of shots. The last two frames should be studied particularly closely."

The World Snooker Association decided to investigate the circumstances behind the result, before a formal police investigation was launched, days before Burnett met Maguire in the 2009 World Championship. Following a report from Strathclyde Police, the Crown announced that it had found insufficient evidence to justify a criminal prosecution.

Burnett qualified for the 2010 Shanghai Masters. He started in the wildcard round, and benefited from Ronnie O'Sullivan withdrawal of the main draw to receive a bye to the second round. Burnett then beat Andrew Higginson, Mark Davis (coming back from 0–3 and 1–4), and Jamie Cope en route to his first ranking event final, where he was defeated 7–10 by world number 4 Ali Carter.

Burnett could not qualify for a single ranking tournament during the 2011–12 season. He finished it ranked world number 39 and needed to perform well in the first three tournaments of next season, before he lost the large number of ranking points he gained for reaching the 2010 final in Shanghai.

Burnett did start the new season strongly as he qualified for the first two ranking events, the Wuxi Classic and Australian Goldfields Open. In Wuxi he beat Neil Robertson 5–1 in the first round, before losing to Mark Davis 3–5. In Australia Burnett defeated world number one Mark Selby 5–3, but then exited the tournament in the second round again following a 1–5 defeat to Marco Fu, with Burnett bemoaning a lack of consistency in his game. Despite this he then almost won his first professional title at the minor-ranking Gdynia Open, which formed part of the Players Tour Championship series, by reaching the final where he faced Neil Robertson. He trailed 0–3 in the best of seven frames match, but came back to level the match at 3–3. The decider lasted 52 minutes with Burnett missing a black off its spot with one red left to lose 3–4. However, his run to the final helped him to qualify for the Finals by finishing 12th on the PTC Order of Merit. In the Finals he faced Robertson once more and was beaten again, this time by a 2–4 scoreline. Burnett also qualified for the International Championship, but lost 3–6 to Stephen Maguire in the first round. From December 2012 until the end of the season Burnett could not win another match, culminating in a 6–10 loss to Yu Delu in the third round of World Championship Qualifying. He ended the season where he began it, ranked world number 39.

Burnett's deepest run in a ranking event in the 2013–14 season was at the German Masters where he beat Ratchayothin Yotharuck 5–2, Joel Walker 5–2, before losing 5–1 to Xiao Guodong in the last 16. He won three matches in World Championship concluding with a 10–8 victory over Ben Woollaston to reach the Crucible for the fourth time. Burnett led Joe Perry 6–3 after the opening session, but was defeated 10–7 and said afterwards that he was not enjoying snooker any more and that it was becoming a chore.

He began the 2014–15 season with a quarter-final showing at the Yixing Open, where he lost 4–2 to Ding Junhui. Burnett overcame Matthew Stevens 6–1 in the first round of the International Championship and then knocked out Judd Trump 6–5. Despite this apparent big win against a top eight player, Burnett did not think he had played well due to needing three or four chances to win each frame. He reached the quarter-finals with a 6–2 victory over Peter Ebdon, but had his mistakes punished by Ricky Walden in a 6–1 thrashing. Burnett could not win a match at a ranking event during the rest of the season. He did win two games in World Championship qualifying, before losing 10–6 to Craig Steadman.

Three qualifying wins saw Burnett play at the 2015 Australian Goldfields Open and he lost 5–3 to Joe Perry in round one. His best run of the 2015–16 season was at the UK Championship, where wins over Sanderson Lam, Alan McManus and Li Hang saw him reach the last 16. Burnett recovered from a 4–1 deficit against John Higgins to level, but would be defeated 6–4. He entered the first three events of the 2016–17 season, but has now not played a professional match since July 2016 and has been relegated from the tour.

Performance and rankings timeline

Career finals

Ranking finals: 1

Minor-ranking finals: 1

Amateur finals: 1 (1 title)

References

External links

Jamie Burnett at worldsnooker.com
 
 Player Progile on Global Snooker

1975 births
Living people
Scottish snooker players
Sportspeople from Hamilton, South Lanarkshire